Tamizhi is a 2019 Indian Tamil language documentary web series created, produced and composed by Hiphop Tamizha, in their digital debut. The eight-episode web series is directed by Pradeep Kumar and written by Elango, which is a research documentary series based on evolution of Tamil writing script. The first episode was aired on 2 October 2019, through the composer's official YouTube channel, and its finale was aired on 22 November 2019.

Production 
The making of the documentary web series was revealed by Hiphop Tamizha Adhi in around 2017 while he was busy with his upcoming Tamil film projects as composer including for Thamizhan Endru Sol, Vantha Rajavathaan Varuven, Imaikka Nodigal, Thani Oruvan 2 and Natpe Thunai. It was revealed that Hiphop Aadhi himself had research on ancient Tamil language for more than a year before coming across an idea to produce a documentary series. The official trailer of the web series was unveiled on 11 December 2018 on the eve of birth anniversary of late Tamil popular poet Subramania Bharati.

Soundtrack 

A promotional song for the web series was composed and written by Hiphop Tamizha, who also sung the along with Anthony Daasan. was released as a music video on 21 September 2019 on YouTube, and as a single in all streaming platforms on the same day.

Episodes

See also	
 Tamizhi	
 Tamil inscriptions

References 

Tamil-language web series
Tamil-language historical television series
2019 Tamil-language television series debuts
2019 Tamil-language television series endings